Minor league baseball teams were based in Harlingen, Texas in various seasons between 1931 and 2014. Harlingen teams played as members of the 1931 Rio Grande Valley League, 1938 Texas Valley League, 1950 Rio Grande Valley League, the Gulf Coast League from 1951 to 1953, Big State League in 1954 and 1955, Texas League in 1960 and 1961, 1976 Gulf States League and 1977 Lone Star League , winning four league championships. The Rio Grande Valley WhiteWings played in various leagues between 1994 and 2014. The Harlingen minor league home ballpark was Harlingen Field.

Harlingen teams were a minor league affiliate of the Detroit Tigers in 1938 and San Francisco Giants in 1960 and 1961.

History
Minor league baseball began in Harlingen, Texas in 1931. The Harlingen Ladds played briefly as members of the 1931 Rio Grande Valley League and placed 3rd in their first season of play. On July 29, 1931, the Ladds had a record of 43–49, playing under manager Paul Trammel, when the Rio Grande Valley League folded.

Harlingen returned to minor league play in 1938, winning a championship. The Harlingen Hubs became members of the 1938 Texas Valley League and were a minor league affiliate of the Detroit Tigers. The Hubbs finished 2nd in the regular season in 1938, but swept through the playoffs undefeated to capture the Texas Valley League Championship, while playing under manager Jake Atz. The league folded after the 1938 season.

The Harlingen Capitals were members of the Class D level Rio Grande Valley League in 1950 and Class B level Gulf Coast League from 1951 to 1953. They were founding members of the Gulf Coast League, along with the Brownsville Charros, Corpus Christi Aces, Galveston White Caps, Lake Charles Lakers, Laredo Apaches, Port Arthur Seahawks and Texas City Texans. When the Gulf Coast League folded after the 1953 season, Harlingen joined the Big State League, playing in the 1954 and 1955 seasons.

The Rio Grande Valley Giants, played in the Class AA level Texas League in 1960 and 1961 as an affiliate of the San Francisco Giants. Baseball Hall of Fame inductee Gaylord Perry played for the Giants in 1960. The franchise moved to Victoria, Texas on June 10, 1961, to complete the season. In 1976, the Rio Grande Valley White Wings played in the Gulf States League and the Harlingen Suns played in the 1977 Lone Star League, both leagues folded after one season. Later Rio Grande Valley White Wings teams played in independent professional leagues through 2015.

The ballpark
Beginning in 1950, Harlingen minor league teams were noted to have played home games at Harlingen Field. Opening as Lon C. Hill Field, the ballpark was also called Giants Field. Harlingen Field is still in use today and most recently was home to the Independent professional Rio Grande Valley WhiteWings. The ballpark address is North O Street & Fair Park Boulevard, Harlingen, Texas.

Year–by–year records

Notable alumni

Baseball Hall of Fame alumni
 Gaylord Perry (1960) Inducted, 1991

Notable alumni
 Jake Atz (1938, MGR)
Bobby Bolin (1960)
 Earl Caldwell (1951-1952)
 Ford Garrison (1955)
 Sam Harshaney (1950-1951)
 Ron Herbel (1960)
 Chuck Hiller (1960)
 Manny Mota (1960) MLB All-Star
John Orsino (1960)
 Dee Phillips (1938)
Jose Tartabull (1961)
Ted Uhlaender (1976, MGR)

See also
Harlingen Capitals playersHarlingen Hubs players

References

External links
Baseball Reference

Harlingen, Texas